Stafford Heginbotham (12 September 1933 – 21 April 1995) was a British businessman and chairman of Bradford City football club at the time of 56 deaths in the Bradford City stadium fire, which occurred immediately after the club won league promotion that mandated a costly upgrading of spectator facilities. A 2015 book revealed the extent of Heginbotham's fire insurance claims before the disaster, which had led to him being the subject of local innuendo about arson. In the light of the book's revelations the head of a 1985 public inquiry into the disaster maintained there was still no reason to think there had been anything sinister about the stadium fire, although he acknowledged it was cause for suspicion that Heginbotham had been a serial insurance claimant.

Biography
In the mid 1950s he worked as a salesman for a soft furnishings company, and by the age of 24 he was regarded as the firm's best salesman. Heginbotham married Lorna Silverwood and had two sons, James and Simon, who still reside in West Yorkshire. Heginbotham created the "Stafford Heginbotham Castle Trophy Highest Aggregate Wickets" in the Bradford Cricket League. The trophy is still running to this date.

Toy manufacturer
In 1971, Heginbotham set-up the Bradford-based company Tebro Toys. Six years later the Bradford Telegraph & Argus had quoted Heginbotham as saying "I have just been unlucky" after the business suffered two major fires in succession. One was found to have been started by children. Heginbotham claimed today's equivalent of £3 million for the destruction of the premises and a large amount of stock just before Christmas. He did not use the insurance proceeds to re-open the business, despite Bradford City Council's attempts to save the company and a proposed merger with a Welsh-based toy company. It is a matter of dispute how seriously innuendo about Heginbotham being a serial arsonist and insurance fraudster was meant, but when Bradford businessmen in the 1970s saw smoke in the sky, they joked "that will be one of Stafford's".

Bradford City 
Heginbotham became chairman of Bradford City football club, where he was a popular figure, the current official mascot for Bradford City A.F.C. was introduced by Heginbotham in 1966, the 'City Gent' character being modelled on him. He was credited with saying that 'Football is the Opera of the people". He was known for wearing a wig, former player John Hendrie recalled that: "We all lived in each other's pockets back then. Stafford Heginbotham would come in the dressing room before a game and offer us £200 for a few drinks that night if we won. We wouldn't see him again until 2.50pm the following week and he'd make it double or quits. Looking at his "syrup", we'd always ask when he was going to pay (toupee) – it would go straight over his head!".

In his autobiography, The Real McCall, former Bradford City A.F.C. player Stuart McCall talks of agreeing a tax-free payment with Stafford Heginbotham which was not honoured by Jack Tordoff. McCall took the club to the Football League and, after a second hearing, won his case. Speaking about the issue, Jack Tordoff stated that: "Stuart was very close to Stafford Heginbotham, and he and Stuart arranged a deal while they were on a club end-of-season holiday. Stuart signed a three-year contract, but Stafford promised him privately that if we didn't get promotion he could leave the club. Stafford also promised him a signing-on fee of £50,000, and that went into his contract, but Stafford didn't tell the board that this sum was tax-free. At the end of the season we allowed Stuart to break his contract and leave for Everton to further his career because a promise had been made to him. Stuart took us to a tribunal. The tribunal ruled in favour of the club, but Stuart appealed against this decision and got Stafford to go with him. Stafford told the tribunal he had promised a tax-free payment to Stuart so the club paid up on the same day."

Stadium fire
In the penultimate game of the 1984–85 season the club had secured promotion to Division Two, thereby making the replacement of existing spectator terracing that dated from 1911 a necessary expense under safety regulations. Hegginbotham received an estimate of £2 million for the construction of a new stand. According to author Martin Fletcher, Heginbotham lacked the financial resources to pay for new terracing, and was at that time having difficulty meeting the wage bill and running costs at the club.

Just before half time in the final game of the season a fire started at one end of the stand that would have to be replaced. The wooden structure was quickly ablaze; heat and thick smoke meant spectators had only minutes to escape. Half of the 56 people who died in the blaze were either aged under 20 or over 70 years old. Hundreds were injured, and many of the survivors required plastic surgery.

Interviewed immediately afterwards, Heginbotham, who had been in the director's box about 50 yards away from where the fire originally started, said he thought two flares or smoke bombs had gone off before the fire started. The wooden stand had been used for decades during which time on any given match day hundreds of supporters in it would smoke. An inquiry heard from a man and his nephew seated near the apparent origin of the blaze and concluded that a lit cigarette had fallen through gaps in the floor of the wooden structure and ignited accumulated paper rubbish, although there was no testimony suggesting who could have been responsible. 
Bradford City received insurance proceeds and local government grants totalling £7 million in today's terms to rebuild facilities. Before the disaster the club, which had been seeking to comply with grant issuing bodies so as to secure funding, carried out some safety work on the stand after Heginbotham was officially warned by the local authority of the danger of a cigarette falling through the flooring and igniting rubbish underneath the wooden structure. Open steps were also reportedly criticised. An article by investigative journalist Paul Foot in the Daily Mirror catalogued five previous fires at Heginbotham businesses, and suggested that in view of his previous experience, it was odd he had failed to effectively act on the local authority fire officers' warnings. Heginbotham threatened to sue, and Foot dropped the story. In the aftermath of the Bradford deaths, Heginbotham's reputation for deliberately setting fires received little or no mention in the local media despite an accusatory graffiti campaign targeting his businesses.

Hotelier 
He resigned after the disaster, but returned for a second spell as chairman before finally leaving in January 1988.
Following the sale of his shares in Bradford City A.F.C. Heginbotham converted his then home in Tong called Pastures into a hotel in late 1987. Two years later the Tong Village Hotel opened. In 1990 he sold the hotel in a shares transaction deal to Whitbread, receiving a million shares; he then moved to Jersey as a tax exile.

Death
In 1995, following a heart transplant operation at St George's Hospital in Tooting, Heginbotham died. He was 61. His funeral was held at Bradford Cathedral in early May 1995 and he was interred at Undercliffe Cemetery overlooking Valley Parade.

Bradford Stadium fire controversy  

Shortly before the 30th anniversary of the disaster, a book authored by a survivor of the disaster (Fifty-Six: The Story of the Bradford Fire by Martin Fletcher, whose father, brother, uncle and grandfather died in the fire) pointed to Heginbotham's proceeds from insurance payouts for an extraordinary number of his business premises that had burnt down between 1967 and 1981. The book alleged there were eight fires at his premises and Heginbotham had recouped ten million pounds at today's values in insurance before the stadium fire. His total compensation for fires including the burning down of the stand amounted to the equivalent of £27 million at current values.

In interviews and a documentary for Yorkshire BBC television, a former detective who had been involved with the inquiry, which was never a criminal investigation, asserted that a man, since deceased, had admitted to accidentally dropping a cigarette and starting the fire. However, the man's nephew, who had been with him at the disaster and also testified to the inquiry, insisted his uncle had made no such admission at the time or subsequently. The judge who had headed the original inquiry into the Bradford Stadium deaths, Oliver Popplewell, acknowledged the new information supplied in the book was grounds for being "highly suspicious" about some of Heginbotham's dealings, but stood by the inquiry's conclusion that the fire in the stand had been an accident.

Heginbotham had a sign in his office that read: 'There are three types of people – those who make things happen, those who watch things happen and those who wonder what happened'.

References

External links
Heginbotham interviewed on the day of the Bradford fire

1933 births
1995 deaths
Bradford City A.F.C. directors and chairmen
Businesspeople from Bradford
20th-century English businesspeople